Rosario Rampanti (born 13 March 1949) is an Italian retired football player and manager who played as a midfielder.

Career
Rampanti started his senior career with Torino in the  Serie A, where he made one-hundred and twelve league appearances and scored eight goals. After that, he played for S.S.C. Napoli, Bologna 1909, Brescia Calcio, APIA Leichhardt, S.P.A.L., and Real Cerretese.

References

External links 
 The former Rampanti grenade: dear Del Piero, this is what it's like to be a footballer in Sydney
 Rampanti, from Turin to Naples in the era of "slipping wings"
 Rampanti: 'After the scandal, Toro is even stronger and more sympathetic 
 EXCLUSIVE TG - Rampanti: "Turin must concentrate more and have the character to handle matches well" 
 In Pisa I understood that I could be a footballer...!! - Rosario Rampanti

1949 births
Living people
Italian footballers
Association football midfielders
Torino F.C. players
Pisa S.C. players
Bologna F.C. 1909 players
Brescia Calcio players
APIA Leichhardt FC players
S.S.C. Napoli players
Italian football managers
Benevento Calcio managers
A.S. Lodigiani managers
S.S. Arezzo managers
Torino F.C. managers